Christian Albrecht, 2nd Prince of Hohenlohe-Langenburg (27 March 1726, in Langenburg – 4 July 1789, in Ludwigsruhe), was the second ruling Prince of Hohenlohe-Langenburg and a Dutch lieutenant-general.

He was the first child of Ludwig, Prince of Hohenlohe-Langenburg and Countess Eleonore of Nassau-Saarbrücken.  When his father died on 16 January 1765, Christian Albrecht succeeded him as Prince of Hohenlohe-Langenburg.

Marriage and issue 
On 13 May 1761 in Gedern, he married Princess Caroline of Stolberg-Gedern (1731–1796), daughter of Prince Frederick Charles of Stolberg-Gedern.
  
From their marriage, the couple had the following children:
 Karl Ludwig (born: 10 September 1762; died:4 April 1825)
 married Countess Amalia of Solms-Baruth
 Louise Eleonore (born: 11 August 1763; died: 30 April 1837)
 married Georg I, Duke of Saxe-Meiningen
 Gustav Adolf (born: 9 October 1764, died: 21 July 1796)
 Christine Caroline (born: 19 November 1765; died: 6 December 1768)
 Ludwig Wilhelm (born: 16 February 1767; died: 17 December 1768)
 Christian August (born: 15 March 1768; died: 18 April 1796)
 Auguste Karoline (born: 15 November 1769; died: 30 July 1803)

Princes of Hohenlohe-Langenburg
People from Langenburg
1726 births
1789 deaths
18th-century German people